"Dream of Me" is a song written by Jimmy Darrell, Raleigh Squires and Buddy Cannon, and recorded by American country music artist Vern Gosdin.  It was released in May 1981 as the second single from the album Today My World Slipped Away.  The song reached #7 on the Billboard Hot Country Singles & Tracks chart.

Other versions

 The song was originally recorded by The Oak Ridge Boys on their 1981 album Fancy Free.

The song was covered by Alison Krauss on her 2017 solo album "Windy City," which was produced by one of the song's co-writers, Buddy Cannon.

Chart performance

References

1981 singles
1981 songs
The Oak Ridge Boys songs
Vern Gosdin songs
Alison Krauss songs
Songs written by Buddy Cannon